Bruno Montelongo Gesta (born 12 September 1987) is a Uruguayan professional footballer who plays as a right-back.

Club career 
Montelongo started his professional career with River Plate Montevideo, playing with their first team since 2007. In August 2010, he was loaned out to Italian Serie A club Milan, while River president, Juan José Tudurí has been reported saying that Milan will decide within five or six months whether to fully purchase the player or not.

On 26 January 2011, Bologna announced to have acquired Montelongo's playing rights on loan from Milan, a sub-loan.

Montelongo joined Spanish club Xerez CD on 11 September 2018. Exactly 3 months later the club announced, that they had terminated the players contract because he had received an offer from his home country, that he had accepted. The club turned out to be Centro Atlético Fénix, which he signed for on 8 January 2019. He left Fénix again at the end of the year.

Montelongo remained without club until the end of July 2020, where he signed with Rampla Juniors for the rest of the year. In December 2020, Montelongo tore his anterior cruciate ligament for the third time in his career (first time in 2008 and second time in 2011). However, he was offered to stay at the club and extended his contract.

International career 
Montelongo has played internationally for Uruguay U-20, taking part in the 2007 FIFA U-20 World Cup.

Statistics 
As of 26 January 2011.

1Continental competitions include Copa Sudamericana and the UEFA Champions League.
2Other tournaments include none to date.

Personal life 
Though born in Uruguay, Montelongo is of Italian descent and therefore also holds an Italian passport.

References

External links 
 Profile at official club website
 
 
 

1987 births
Living people
Footballers from Montevideo
Uruguayan footballers
Association football defenders
Uruguayan Primera División players
Club Atlético River Plate (Montevideo) players
A.C. Milan players
Bologna F.C. 1909 players
Peñarol players
Segunda División B players
Extremadura UD footballers
Córdoba CF players
Xerez CD footballers
Centro Atlético Fénix players
Rampla Juniors players
Uruguay under-20 international footballers
Uruguayan expatriate footballers
Uruguayan expatriate sportspeople in Italy
Uruguayan expatriate sportspeople in Spain
Expatriate footballers in Italy
Expatriate footballers in Spain